Hamidullah Afsar Merathi was an Indian Urdu poet and writer. He was born in 1895 and died on 19 April 1974 at Lucknow.

References

External links
 List of Urdu Authors
 http://www.gandhiserve.org/cwmg/VOL082.PDF
 http://www.salaam.co.uk/knowledge/biography/viewentry.php?id=169 
 Peace & Harmony Stories from South Asia, Association for Communal Harmony in Asia (ACHA)

1895 births
1974 deaths
Urdu-language poets from India
20th-century Indian poets
Indian male poets
20th-century Indian male writers